Samuel Charles Silkin, Baron Silkin of Dulwich, PC, QC (6 March 1918 – 17 August 1988) was a British Labour Party politician and cricketer.

Early life
He was the second son of Lewis Silkin (afterwards Baron Silkin), a Labour Member of Parliament (MP) and a minister in Clement Attlee's Cabinet from 1945 to 1950. His younger brother, John, was also an MP and Cabinet minister.

Samuel Silkin was educated at Dulwich College and Trinity Hall, Cambridge. He played two games of first-class cricket in 1938, one each for Cambridge University Cricket Club and Glamorgan County Cricket Club.

Career
He became a lawyer; he was called to the bar in 1941. On 18 March 1946, Silkin, with the military rank of lieutenant colonel, presided over the Double Tenth war crimes trials at the Supreme Court Building in Singapore. Twenty-one Japanese Kenpeitai were accused of torturing 57 internees, resulting in the deaths of 15. On 15 April 1946, after a hearing lasting 21 days, eight were sentenced to death by hanging. Three others received life imprisonment, one a sentence of fifteen years, and two were given prison terms of eight years. Seven were acquitted.

In 1963, Silkin was raised to the rank of Queen's Counsel. He chaired the Society of Labour Lawyers. He served as a councillor on Camberwell Borough Council from 1953 until 1959.

Parliamentary career
At the 1964 general election, Silkin was elected Member of Parliament for the Dulwich constituency, adjoining his father's former constituency of Peckham.  He was re-elected in Dulwich until his retirement at the 1983 general election.

From 1974 to 1979, he served as Attorney General for England and Wales and Northern Ireland under Labour Prime Ministers Harold Wilson and James Callaghan. After his retirement from politics, he was created a life peer as Baron Silkin of Dulwich, of North Leigh in the County of Oxfordshire on 13 May 1985.

Family
Silkin died in 1988, aged 70. He left, by his first wife Elaine Stamp (whom he married in 1941), two sons and two daughters.  He did not have any children by his widow, Sheila Swanston, whom he married in 1985 after his first wife's death.

References

External links 
 

|-

|-

1918 births
1988 deaths
Alumni of Trinity Hall, Cambridge
Attorneys General for England and Wales
Attorneys General for Northern Ireland
English King's Counsel
Cambridge University cricketers
Councillors in Greater London
English barristers
English Jews
English people of Lithuanian-Jewish descent
Glamorgan cricketers
Labour Party (UK) MPs for English constituencies
Labour Party (UK) life peers
Members of Camberwell Metropolitan Borough Council
Members of the Privy Council of the United Kingdom
Northern Ireland Government ministers
People educated at Dulwich College
Politics of the London Borough of Southwark
20th-century King's Counsel
UK MPs 1964–1966
UK MPs 1966–1970
UK MPs 1970–1974
UK MPs 1974
UK MPs 1974–1979
UK MPs 1979–1983
Welsh cricketers
Younger sons of barons
People from Dulwich
Jewish British politicians
20th-century English lawyers
Silkin
Life peers created by Elizabeth II